Digital diplomacy, also referred to as Digiplomacy and eDiplomacy (see below), has been defined as the use of the Internet and new information communication technologies to help achieve diplomatic objectives. However, other definitions have also been proposed. The definition focuses on the interplay between internet and diplomacy, ranging from Internet driven-changes in the environment in which diplomacy is conducted to the emergence of new topics on diplomatic agendas such as cybersecurity, privacy and more, along with the use of internet tools to practice diplomacy.

Platform-specific terms that have also evolved in this diplomacy category include Facebook diplomacy, Twitter diplomacy, and Google diplomacy.

Overview
The UK Foreign and Commonwealth Office defines digital diplomacy as 'solving foreign policy problems using the internet', a narrower definition that excludes internal electronic collaboration tools and mobile phone and tablet-based diplomacy. The US State Department uses the term 21st Century Statecraft The Canadian Department of Foreign Affairs, Trade and Development calls it Open Policy.

Digital diplomacy can be practiced by state agencies such as Foreign Ministries, embassies and consulates, individual diplomats such as ambassadors or ambassadors-at-large, and non-state actors such as civil society and human rights groups.

History
The first foreign ministry to establish a dedicated ediplomacy unit was the US State Department, which created the Taskforce on eDiplomacy in 2002. This Taskforce has since been renamed the Office of eDiplomacy and has approximately 80 staff members, about half of which are dedicated to ediplomacy-related work.

Other foreign ministries have also begun to embrace ediplomacy. The UK Foreign and Commonwealth Office has an Office of Digital Diplomacy that is involved in a range of ediplomacy activities. Sweden has also been active in promotion of digital diplomacy, especially through the online communication strategy of its foreign minister Carl Bildt who soon became 'best connected Twitter leader'.

In July 2012, global public relations and communications firm Burson-Marsteller studied the use of Twitter by heads of state and government, referred to as Twitter diplomacy. The study on Twiplomacy  found that there were 264 Twitter accounts of heads of state and government and their institutions in 125 countries worldwide and that only 30 leader's tweet personally. Since then, the attention on digital diplomacy as a tool of public diplomacy has only increased. In 2013, USC Center on Public Diplomacy has named 'Facebook recognizing Kosovo as a country', as one of the top moments in public diplomacy for 2013.

According to the Twiplomacy Study 2020, published in July 2020, 98 percent of UN member states had a diplomatic presence on Twitter. Only Laos, North Korea, Sao Tome and Principe and Turkmenistan lacked representation on the social network.

Facebook diplomacy
Facebook diplomacy is a user created hybrid of public diplomacy and citizen diplomacy as applied in the Facebook social networking platform. After some earlier informal use the term Facebook diplomacy was described at a New York conference on social networking and technology in December 2008.
During the December conference in New York, the United States Undersecretary of Public Diplomacy, James Glassman said, "New technology gives the United States and other free nations a significant advantage over terrorists." In his presentation at New York's Columbia University Law School, he went on to illustrate how Facebook diplomacy and on-line activism created success through the use of Facebook groups and the use of the platform to create activism and cause global awareness relative to issues in Colombia against the infamous FARC rebels.

Facebook ambassador may refer to Facebook Garage Ambassadors who are dedicated to the technical aspect of Facebook development. Research 'Facebook Developer Garage' and 'Garage-In-A-Box'.

Opportunities in digital diplomacy 
The rise of social media as a tool in diplomacy has given way for states to strike up two-way or “dialogic" communication with other diplomatic actors and their foreign publics, compared to the one-way nature of traditional public diplomacy. While traditional diplomacy occurs offline in relative privacy, online diplomacy has allowed a multitude of actors to discuss foreign policy-making, increasing the impact of public opinion on the foreign policy agenda.

This method of diplomacy provides additional avenues for other actors to engage in co-creation with influential people and organizations on multilateral diplomatic campaigns. An example of this would be the 2012-2014 Campaign to End Sexual Violence in Conflict launched by then British foreign secretary William Hague, which used a multi-channel digital and offline approach to engage UN organizations as well as states. A video featuring co-created content by Angelina Jolie, a UN Special Envoy, supporting the campaign managed to attract 15,000 views, compared to the foreign secretary’s similar video, which only attracted 400 views.

This ability for states to listen to their audiences' perceptions of their foreign policy is considered another potential benefit of digital diplomacy. It can provide a new means for states who have severed formal diplomatic ties to collect information about each other’s foreign policy positions. For example, despite the states' strained diplomatic relationship, the U.S. State Department follows the Iranian president on Twitter.

Access to social media as a diplomatic channel has also changed the relative influence of diplomatic actors from states thought to possess little hard power – or power achieved through material resources strength – amongst other diplomatic actors. A study done by Ilan Manor and Elad Segev in 2020 measured the social media mobility of ministries of foreign affairs and UN missions to New York, finding that states with less hard power could use social media to become “supernodes” in online diplomatic networks. This is also referred to this as the “theory of networked diplomacy”.

Challenges in digital diplomacy 
Though states have managed to achieve diplomatic prominence online through their use of Twitter and other online channels, these new diplomatic channels do not come without risks. Messages and images shared on social media platforms, particularly Twitter, have already given rise to diplomatic crises.

In 2018, Global Affairs Canada tweeted a statement calling on Saudi Arabia to release imprisoned human rights activists. In response, Saudi Arabia cut diplomatic and trade ties with Canada, declaring the country’s ambassador persona non grata and recalling Saudi Arabia's ambassador to Canada.

The incident escalated when a pro-government Twitter account later tweeted an image of an Air Canada plane flying in the direction of Toronto’s CN Tower, with the text, “He who interferes with what doesn’t concern him finds what doesn’t please him.” The image incited criticism from many on social media due to perceived parallels between the image and the September 11, 2001 attacks in the United States.

Digital platforms have also enabled the spread of disinformation used to undermine states’ international and domestic stability, such as the interference of the Russian government in the 2016 U.S. presidential election.

See also
 Alliance Française
 British Council
 Cultural Diplomacy
 E-government
 Government by algorithm
 Office of eDiplomacy (US)
 Open government
 Public diplomacy
 Public Diplomacy Council of Catalonia
 Twitter diplomacy
 USC Center on Public Diplomacy

References

External links
 Digiplomacy definition
 Twiplomacy - Mutual Relations on Twitter
 Digiplomacy News
 U.S. immigrant builds bridges with the 'Facebook of Peace'
 Facebook Diplomacy (comic)
 Facebook Diplomacy (Newsweek)
 Facebook Diplomacy: State 'friends' the World 
 Ranking of Governments in Digital Diplomacy - MediaBadger

Diplomacy
Types of diplomacy
E-government